Alibina Belalova is an Uzbekistani former footballer who played as a defender. She has been a member of the Uzbekistan women's national team.

International career
Belalova capped for Uzbekistan at senior level during the 2010 AFC Women's Asian Cup qualification.

See also
List of Uzbekistan women's international footballers

References 

Living people
Uzbekistani women's footballers
Uzbekistan women's international footballers
Women's association football defenders
Year of birth missing (living people)